Long Selaan (also written Long Sela'an) is a settlement in Sarawak, Malaysia.

The village is located in the Ulu Baram area on the Baram River between Long Semiyang (upstream) and Long Moh (downstream). Kenyah villages are often located where a small stream joins a large river, and take the name of the stream; in this case the small stream is Sungai Sela'an.

There are three subgroups of the Kenyah people in the village: Lepo'Ke, Lepo'Belukun and Lepo'Tepuan. There has been a longhouse on this site for at least fifty years. When Lepo'Tau people moved to the area from the Silat River, the people of Long Sela'an gave an area of land downriver to them, which became the settlement of Long Moh.

Neighbouring settlements include:
Long Pasia in Sabah
Long Mio in sabah

References

External links
Long Selaan on Wikimapia

Villages in Sarawak